Jacopo Antonio Morigia oalso known as  Giacomo Antonio  Moriggia (Milan, 23 February 1633 – Pavia, 8 October 1708 ) was a cardinal and Italian Catholic archbishop. 
He was Bishop of San Miniato from  1 September 1681 - 15 February 1683, Metropolitan Archbishop of Florence from 15 February 1683 - 23 October 1699, Cardinal Priest of Santa Cecilia from 11 April 1698 - 8 October 1708, Archpriest of the Liberian Basilica of Santa Maria Maggiore from 20 April - 28 October 1699  and also Bishop of Pavia from 24 January 1701 - 8 October 1708.

He was one of the Cardinals created by Innocent XII.

Life
He came from the illustrious Milanese family of Moriggia, and studied mathematics and architecture, and only joined the church latter in life.
 
Giacomo Antonio Morigia  founded the Barnabites, a society of priests who would concern themselves with the reformation of the laity and the clergy.

References

1633 births
1708 deaths
17th-century Italian Roman Catholic bishops
17th-century Italian cardinals
Clergy from Milan